Rijswijk is a town and municipality in South Holland, Netherlands.

Rijswijk may also refer to:

Rijswijk, Gelderland, a village in the municipality of Buren, Netherlands
Rijswijk, North Brabant, a village in the municipality of Altena, Netherlands
Rijswijk, Indonesia, a site of the Dutch Governor General compound in the Dutch East Indies

Other
Treaty of Ryswick, signed in 1697 in Rijswijk, present-day South Holland